"Once I Was" is a 1967 song by singer-songwriter Tim Buckley, and the sixth track from his album Goodbye and Hello.

Lyrics
The song reflects the point of view of someone who used to be the lover of an unknown subject, but continues to ponder if the subject ever reflects on the experience similarly.

Other performances
Tim Buckley's son, Jeff, recorded a cover of this song for a tribute concert to Tim in 1991.

The song has also been covered by Gregg Allman.

Use in other media
The song was used during Bruce Dern's final sequence in the film Coming Home about Vietnam War veterans dealing with the conflict of trauma long after the war has ended.

References

1967 songs
Songs written by Tim Buckley
1960s ballads
Folk ballads